KBD may refer to:
K-B-D, a Semitic triliteral root meaning "be heavy"
KBD algorithm, for simulating spin models
Kabardian language (ISO 639 code), North Caucasus
Kaiser–Bessel-derived window, in digital signal processing
Kashin–Beck disease, a bone disease
Kentucky Bourbon Distillers
King's Bench Division
, the HTML element for keyboard input